Giannis Xanthopoulos (born 23 June 1967) is a Greek former footballer who played as a defender. He spent 19 years playing in the Alpha Ethniki for Doxa Drama and Ionikos.

References

External links
https://www.sport24.gr/football/omades/Ionikos/article288149.ece

1967 births
Living people
Association football defenders
Greek footballers
Ionikos F.C. players
Footballers from Drama, Greece